The action of 12 March 1672 was a naval battle in the Third Anglo-Dutch War between a squadron commanded by Sir Robert Holmes and Sir Frescheville Holles against the Smyrna convoy, which was protected by 5 warships under De Haaze and Cornelis Evertsen. The Battle took place before the official start of the Third Anglo-Dutch War, but now there was no turning back and England declared war on the Dutch Republic on March 17, 1672.

The Battle
Holmes with a squadron of 5 ships cruising about the Isle of Wight, met with the Dutch Smyrna fleet, consisting of about 50 sail.

When the English fleet closed in with the Smyrna convoy, Holmes ordered Captain De Haaze to come aboard his ship. De Haaze refused, and English ship the "Saint Michael" reacted to this refusal with a broadside after which De Haaze's ship replied in kind, and the engagement became general. At a certain point during the battle Haaze was killed, but his crew kept resisting. Holmes maintained the engagement until sunset, but failed to capture a single ship while his squadron had suffered severe damage. With dawn the action resumed. Four English warships which had hung back the day before now joined the battle. After another whole day of fighting, Evertsen managed to extract 62 merchantmen from danger. The Dutch during the engagement had lost 1 warship and only lost 4 merchantmen of which only 2 were of any value. The English ships had suffered severe damage with one ship disabled.

The Gloucester'''s prize the Klein Hollandia which she had disabled and captured, later foundered off Eastbourne.

Ships involved
The following details are from British Warships in the Age of Sail, 1603–1714''.

Sources

References

Naval battles of the Third Anglo-Dutch War
Conflicts in 1672
Naval battles involving the Dutch Republic
Naval battles involving England
Naval battles of the Franco-Dutch War